The Defense Science Board (DSB) is a committee of civilian experts appointed to advise the U.S. Department of Defense on scientific and technical matters. It was established in 1956 on the recommendation of the second Hoover Commission.

Charter

The Board's charter states its mission as:

The Board shall provide the Secretary of Defense, the Deputy Secretary of Defense, the Under Secretary of Defense for Acquisition, Technology and Logistics, the Chairman of the Joint Chiefs of Staff and, as requested, other Office of the Secretary of Defense (OSD) Principal Staff Assistants, the Secretaries of the Military Departments, the Commanders of the Combatant Commands, independent advice and recommendations on scientific, technical, manufacturing, acquisition process, and other matters of special interest to the Department of Defense. The Board is not established to advise on individual DoD procurements, but instead shall be concerned with the pressing and complex technology problems facing the Department of Defense in such areas as research, engineering, and manufacturing, and will ensure the identification of new technologies and new applications of technology in those areas to strengthen national security. No matter shall be assigned to the Board for its consideration that would require any Board Member to participate personally and substantially in the conduct of any specific procurement or place him or her in the position of acting as a "procurement officials," as that term is defined pursuant to law. The Under Secretary of Defense for Acquisition, Technology and Logistics or designated representative shall be authorized to act upon the advice and recommendations of the Board.

The DSB conducts multiple simultaneous studies each year.  Study topics are selected from requests made by Department of Defense or Congressional leaders.  In addition to studies that can start and stop at any time during the calendar year, the DSB usually conducts one or more "summer studies" each year; the term "summer study" refers to the fact that the panels meet as a large group in August each year (usually in Irvine, California) to work on these particular studies.  Given the fact that these meeting dates are well-established, it is a normal practice for senior DoD personnel interested in the particular study topics for that year to come to the last day of the meeting and be briefed in person on the study findings to-date.  All DSB studies result in a written report, many of which are released to the public.

Current study topics are also mostly listed on the DSB web page.

Membership and designation

The board shall be composed of not more than 45 members and not more than 12 senior fellow members, who are eminent authorities in the fields of science, technology, manufacturing, acquisition, and other matters of special interest to the Department of Defense. The board members shall be appointed by the Secretary of Defense, and their appointments will be renewed on an annual basis. Those members, who are not full-time federal officers or employees, shall be appointed as experts and consultants under the authority of 5 U.S.C. Sec. 3109, and serve as special government employees. Members may be appointed for terms ranging from one to four years. Such appointments will normally be staggered among the board membership to ensure an orderly turnover in the board's overall composition on a periodic basis. With the exception of travel and per diem for official travel, they shall normally serve without compensation, unless otherwise authorized by the appointing authority. The Secretary of Defense, based upon the recommendation of the Under Secretary of Defense (Acquisition, Technology and Logistics), shall appoint the board's chairperson. The Under Secretary of Defense (Acquisition, Technology and Logistics) shall appoint the vice chairperson. The board chairman and vice chairman shall serve two-year terms and, with the Secretary of Defense's approval, may serve additional terms. The Secretary of Defense may invite other distinguished U.S. Government officers to serve as non-voting observers, and the Under Secretary of Defense for Acquisition, Technology and Logistics may invite chairpersons from other DoD-supported federal advisory committees to serve as non-voting observers. The Under Secretary of Defense for Acquisition, Technology, and Logistics may appoint experts and consultants, with special expertise, to assist the board on an ad hoc basis. These experts and consultants, appointed under the authority of 5 U.S.C. Sec. 3109, shall also serve as special government employees; however, they shall have no voting rights on the board. Non-voting observers and those non-voting experts and consultants appointed by the Under Secretary of Defense for Acquisition, Technology, and Logistics shall not count toward the Board's total membership.

History

The Defense Science Board was established in 1956 in response to recommendations of the Hoover Commission:

The Assistant Secretary of Defense (Research and Development) will appoint a standing committee, reporting directly to him, of outstanding basic and applied scientists. This committee will canvass periodically the needs and opportunities presented by new scientific knowledge for radically new weapons systems.

The original membership of the Board, totaling twenty-five, consisted of the chairman of the eleven technical advisory panels in the Office of the Assistant Secretary of Defense (Research and Development), the chairmen of the senior advisory committees of the Army, Navy, and Air Force, the Directors of the National Science Foundation, the National Bureau of Standards, and the National Advisory Committee for Aeronautics (predecessor of the National Aeronautics and Space Administration), the President of the National Academy of Sciences, and seven members-at-large drawn from the scientific and technical community.

The Board met for the first time on September 20, 1956. Its initial assignment concerned the program and administration of basic research, component research, and the advancement of technology in areas of interest to the Department of Defense.

On December 31, 1956, a charter was issued specifying the Board as advisory to the Assistant Secretary of Defense (Research and Development). Following the consolidation of the offices of the Assistant Secretaries of Defense for R&D and Applications Engineering in 1957, the Board reconstituted as advisory to the Secretary of Defense through the Assistant Secretary of Defense (Research and Engineering). Its membership was increased to 28, including as ex officio members, the Chairmen of the President's Science Advisory Committee and the Scientific Advisory Committee in the Office of Guided Missiles, Office of the Secretary of Defense (OSD). A revised Board charter was issued on October 30, 1957.

In accordance with the Department of Defense Reorganization Act of 1958, which stipulated the responsibilities, functions, and authority of the Director of Defense Research and Engineering (DDR&E), the Board's charter was revised on November 23, 1959. This revision harmonized the role and mission of the Defense Science Board with DDR&D's responsibilities, prescribing eight members-at-large and modifying ex officio membership to conform with the establishment or dissolution of advisory panels in the office of the DDR&E.

In the course of organizing his staff, the DDR&E appointed Assistant Directors for several types of warfare systems. Following this action in late 1959, the Board made a study of the structure of scientific and engineering advisory bodies. Its report on this study was implemented by DoD Directive 5129.22, "Defense Science Board Charter," dated April 10, 1961. This directive was revised and reissued on February 17, 1971. In 1978, the title, Director of Defense Research and Engineering, was changed to Under Secretary of Defense for Research and Engineering (USDRE). On July 1, 1986, the title, the Undersecretary of Defense for Research and Engineering, was changed to Under Secretary of Defense for Acquisition (USD/A). On January 1, 1990, the Defense Manufacturing Board, which had reported directly to the USD(A), merged into the Defense Science Board, adding manufacturing issues to the list of items of interest.

Currently, the board's authorized strength is thirty-two members and seven ex officio members (the chairmen of the Army, Navy, Air Force, Policy, Defense Business Board and Defense Intelligence Agency advisory committees). The members are appointed for terms ranging from one to four years and are selected on the basis of their preeminence in the fields of science, technology and its application to military operations, research, engineering, manufacturing and acquisition process.

The board operates by forming task forces consisting of board members and other consultants/experts to address those tasks referred to it by formal direction. The products of each task force typically consist of a set of formal briefings to the board and appropriate DoD officials, and a written report containing findings, recommendations and a suggested implementation plan. The board reports directly to the Secretary of Defense through the USD (AT&L) while, at the same time, working in close coordination with the DDR&E to develop and strengthen the department's research and development strategies for the 21st century.

In recognition of the outstanding advice provided by the DSB to the department over the past forty plus years, the Secretary of Defense established the Eugene G. Fubini award in 1996 for Outstanding Service to the Defense Community in an Advisory Capacity.

Chairmen

Eugene G. Fubini Award Recipients
For Outstanding Contributions to the Department of Defense in an Advisory Capacity

See also 
 Civilian control of the military

External links
Official website

References

American advisory organizations
United States Department of Defense agencies